Camp McGovern AHP Heliport  was a military airport located inside Camp McGovern near Brčko, Bosnia and Herzegovina.

See also
List of airports in Bosnia and Herzegovina

References

External links 
 Airport record for Camp McGovern AHP Heliport at Landings.com

Airports in Bosnia and Herzegovina